Sahali (also Romanized as Saḩalī and Sohlī; also known as Soheylī) is a village in Salakh Rural District, Shahab District, Qeshm County, Hormozgan Province, Iran. At the 2006 census, its population was 1,480, in 300 families.

References 

Populated places in Qeshm County